In economics, the business sector or corporate sector - sometimes popularly called simply "business" - is "the part of the economy made up by companies". It is a subset of the domestic economy, excluding the economic activities of general government, of private households, and of non-profit organizations serving individuals. The business sector is part of the private sector, but it differs in that the private sector includes all non-government activity, including non-profit organizations, while the business sector only includes business that operate for profit.

In the United States the business sector accounted for about 78 percent of the value of gross domestic product (GDP) . Kuwait and Tuvalu each had business sectors accounting for less than 40% of GDP .

In systems of state capitalism, much of the business sector forms part of the public sector.
In  mixed economies, state-owned enterprises may straddle any divide between public and business sectors, allowing analysts to use the concept of a "state-owned enterprise sector".

The Oxford English Dictionary records the phrase "business sector" in the general sense from 1934.
Word usage suggests that the concept of a "business sector" came into wider use after 1940.
Related terms in previous times included "merchant class" and "merchant caste".

See also 
 Bureau of Labor Statistics (BLS), a unit of the United States Department of Labor
 Business
 GDP
 Private sector
 State-owned enterprise

References

External links

United States
 Business sector: Productivity, hourly compensation, unit labor costs, and prices, seasonally adjusted, Bureau of Labor Statistics
 Regulatory Information by Business Sector, U.S. Environmental Protection Agency
 Business Sector, CDC

United Kingdom
 , Department for Business, Innovation and Skills
 Your business sector, Business Link
 Business Sectors, UK Trade & Investment
 E

Business
Private sector